FreeSBIE is a live CD, an operating system that is able to load directly from a bootable CD with no installation process or hard disk. It is based on the FreeBSD operating system. Its name is a pun on frisbee. Currently, FreeSBIE uses Xfce and Fluxbox.

FreeSBIE 1.0 was based on FreeBSD 5.2.1 and released on February 27, 2004. The first version of FreeSBIE 2 was developed during the summer of 2005, thanks to the Google Summer of Code. FreeSBIE 2.0.1, which is a complete rewrite of the so-called toolkit, is based on FreeBSD 6.2 and was released on February 10, 2007. According to DistroWatch the FreeSBIE project is discontinued.

Goals 
The goals of the FreeSBIE project are:
To develop a suite of programs to be used to create one's own CD, with all the personalizations desired
To make various ISO images available, each with its different goals and possible uses

See also 
 Comparison of BSD operating systems

References

External links 
historic FreeSBIE project homepage (archive.org)
An interview with a FreeSBIE developer

FreeBSD
Live CD